Cheater is the second studio album by Norwegian post-punk band Pom Poko. The album was originally scheduled for release on 6 November 2020, but was moved to 15 January 2021.

Release
On 18 August 2020, Pom Poko announced the release of their second studio album, originally scheduled for release on 6 November 2020. However, due to the COVID-19 pandemic, the album's release date was moved to 15 January 2021.

Singles

Pom Poko released the first single from the album, "Andrew" on 18 August 2020.

On 15 September 2020, Pom Poko released the second single "My Candidacy". In a press release, the band explained the meaning of the song: "The song itself is about the wish to be able to believe in unconditional love, even though you know that there probably is no such thing. We, at least, believe in unconditional love for riffy tunes with sing-song choruses."

The third single "Like a Lady" was released on 11 November 2020.

Critical reception
Cheater was met with "generally favorable" reviews from critics. At Metacritic, which assigns a weighted average rating out of 100 to reviews from mainstream publications, this release received an average score of 77 based on 8 reviews. At AnyDecentMusic?, the release was given a 7.3 out of 10 based on 10 reviews.

In a review for AllMusic, Heather Phares noted how the release sounds "looser and more cohesive", going on to say "It's not every day when a band makes a second album that's more thrilling than their debut, but Pom Poko aren't an everyday band." Tom Dibb of Gigwise rated the album an 8 out of 10, explaining it was "packed full of angelic voices, funky bass tones and heavy guitar riffs, Cheater is a brilliantly mish-mashed blending of genres." Drew Litowitz of Pitchfork stated: "The Norwegian quartet’s second album effortlessly waltzes between technical art-rock, dissonant post-punk, and pop’s irresponsible sugar high. Over the course of 33 minutes, Pom Poko capture the feeling of adorable debauchery. Though their second album, Cheater, may sound unserious at first, angst and snark bubble up through cutting riffs and heart-shaped chaos."

Track listing

Personnel
Pom Poko
 Ragnhild Fangel – vocals, production
 Martin Tonne – guitar, percussion, synthesizer, vocals, production
 Jonas Krøvel – bass, synthesizer, production
 Ola Djupvik – drums, percussion, synthesizer, production

Additional personnel
 Marcus Forsgren – production, mixing, engineering
 George Tanderø – mastering
 Erlend Peder Kvam – cover art, design

References

External links
 
 

2021 albums
Bella Union albums